A pig scalder is a tool that was used to soften the skin of a pig after it had been killed to remove the hair from its skin. Because people rarely slaughter and process their own pigs anymore, pig scalders are seldom used for domestic use.

Modern swine processing plants use industrial scalders as part of their slaughterhall process.

There were many shapes and sizes for scalders depending on materials used to construct it and how much was spent on it. In general, a pig scalder looks like a very large pot or tub. It would be made of wood or metal, though a metal scalder meant that you could build a fire beneath the scalder in order to heat the water inside. In New Zealand, many farmers use their old cast iron bathtubs for this job, but the tubs are becoming harder to acquire. Metal scalders were also easier to clean after use.

See also 
Pig slaughter
Scalding-house

References

Farming tools
Pig farming
Meat industry
Franconian culture